Yves Beauchemin (born 26 June 1941) is a Quebec novelist.

Born in Rouyn-Noranda, Quebec, Beauchemin received his degree in French literature and art history at the Université de Montréal in 1965. He taught literature at the Collège Garneau and Université Laval. Beauchemin was working as an editor in a Montreal publishing firm when he began contributing essays and stories to magazines and newspapers. In 1969 he accepted a position as a researcher at Radio-Québec.

Beauchemin's first novel, L'enfirouapé (1974), won the Prix France-Québec. His second novel, Le matou (1981), became the all-time best-selling novel in French Quebec literature and has been translated into seventeen languages. Beauchemin won the Prix Jean Giono for his third novel, Juliette Pormerleau (1989).

In his fiction Beauchemin is a detached but caring observer of the contemporary world around him. The panoramic canvases of his novels capture the teeming life of the streets, reflecting their author's appreciation of such great nineteenth-century writers as Balzac, Dickens, Dostoevsky and Gogol.

He resides in Longueuil, Quebec.

References

Bibliography
L'enfirouapé - 1974
Le matou - 1981 (translated as The Alley Cat - 1986)
Juliette Pormerleau - 1989 (translated as Juliette - 1990), Grand prix des lectrices de Elle 
Le second violon - 1996 (translated as The Second Violin - 1998)
 Les Emois d'un Marchand de Café - 1999
Charles le téméraire - 2004  (translated as Charles The Bold - 2007)
Charles le téméraire - Un saut dans le vide - 2005  (translated as The Years of Fire: Charles the Bold, Volume 2 - 2007)
Charles le téméraire - Parti pour la gloire - 2006  (translated as A Very Bold Leap: Charles the Bold, Volume 3 - 2009)
Antoine et Alfred- 2006
La serveuse du Café Cherrier - 2011
Les Empocheurs - 2016

External links
Biography at Québec Amérique (in French)

Writers from Quebec
1941 births
Living people
Canadian male novelists
Université de Montréal alumni
People from Rouyn-Noranda
Officers of the National Order of Quebec
20th-century Canadian novelists
21st-century Canadian novelists
Academic staff of Université Laval
Canadian novelists in French
Grand prix Jean Giono recipients
20th-century Canadian male writers
21st-century Canadian male writers